Artyphius (Old Persian: Ardufya) was a general of the Achaemenid Army during the Second Persian invasion of Greece (480-479 BCE). He was the son of Artabanus, grandson of Hystaspes, and therefore nephew of Darius the Great and first degree cousin of Xerxes I. 

According to Herodotus, Artyphius was in command of the contingents of the Gandharian and Dadicae in the invading Achaemenid army of Xerxes I:

Artyphius had a brother, named Tritantaechmes, who also a general in the army of Xerxes I.

References

Military leaders of the Achaemenid Empire
Persian people of the Greco-Persian Wars
5th-century BC Iranian people